Cockcroft v Smith (1705) 11 Mod 43 is an English tort law case. It concerned the definition of legitimate self defence.

Facts
Mr. Cockcroft ran his finger towards Mr. Smith's eyes. Mr. Smith bit off part of Mr. Cockcroft's finger.

Judgment
Holt CJ said in the course of his judgment,

See also
English tort law
battery
Self defence
Green v Goddard (1702) 2 Salk 641
Lane v Holloway [1968] 1 QB 379
Ashley v Chief Constable of Sussex Police [2007] 1 WLR 398
Criminal Law Act 1967 s 3
Criminal Justice Act 2003 s 329

References
B Feldthusen, 'The Canadian Experiment with the Civil Action for Sexual Battery' in NJ Mullany (ed) Torts in the Nineties (Sydney, Law Book Co 1997)

English tort case law
1705 in law
1705 in England
Lord Holt cases
Court of King's Bench (England) cases